By the Throat is the third and final studio album by American hip hop duo Eyedea & Abilities. It was released on Rhymesayers Entertainment on July 21, 2009.

Critical reception

At Metacritic, which assigns a weighted average score out of 100 to reviews from mainstream critics, the album received an average score of 76, based on 6 reviews, indicating "generally favorable reviews".

Andrew Dietzel of PopMatters gave the album 9 stars out of 10, commenting that "By the Throat, succinct and emotive, is the perfect convergence of styles, attacking the listener's jugular with a powerful punk thrust, cynical observations, and an out-and-out assault on hip-hop's standards." Adam Figman of URB gave the album 4 stars out of 5, saying, "Combined with newly found experiences, newly discovered self-awareness and newly refined skills, By the Throat catches this almost forgotten duo at a new height of their combined powers."

Track listing

Personnel
Credits adapted from liner notes.

 Eyedea – vocals, lyrics, production (1, 5), keyboards (1, 4, 5, 7, 8, 10, 11), guitar (1, 3–6, 8–10), bass guitar (1, 9), drum programming (2, 10), percussion (2, 10), recording, mixing
 DJ Abilities – production, keyboards (1, 3, 4, 7), turntables (2, 4, 6–8, 10), bass guitar (3)
 JT Bates – drums (1)
 Jeremy Ylvisaker – guitar (2, 8, 11), bass guitar (2, 6), percussion (2)
 Casey O'Brien – bass guitar (4)
 Brian Johnson – mixing, mastering
 Michael Gaughan – artwork
 Siddiq – layout, design

Charts

References

External links
 
 

2009 albums
Eyedea & Abilities albums
Rhymesayers Entertainment albums